Heartland was an Australian television drama series that ran on the Australian Broadcasting Corporation in 1994. It ran for thirteen episodes and starred Cate Blanchett and Ernie Dingo. The show was also known as Burned Bridge in some countries.

At the ARIA Music Awards of 1995, the album was nominated for ARIA Award for Best Original Soundtrack, Cast or Show Album.

Plot summary 
Heartland deals with the mystery surrounding the death of an Aboriginal girl and the doubts concerning the guilt of her boyfriend, who is arrested for her murder. It is also a love story between two of the people convinced of his innocence — their growing relationship must survive hostility from both the white and black communities and the obstacles of their different backgrounds, attitudes and cultures. 
Set in a small coastal town against the turmoils of murder, mystery and romance, Heartland follows the people from this seaside community and their battle to restructure their own way of life. Their struggle to restore their self-esteem towards a positive future, despite the obstacles in their path.

Other plot elements revolve around the character of Elizabeth Ashton (Blanchett), a writer arriving in a small coastal community. A degree of suspicion exists towards the newcomer who is ignorant of any underlying racial tensions. This naivety allows her to more easily befriend local Aborigine Vincent Burunga (Dingo). Into this mix is the local police officer Phil McCarthy (Steven Vidler) who seeks Ashton's affections whilst being hostile to her friendship with Burunga, not just as a rival suitor, but because of racial prejudice.

Cast 
 Ernie Dingo as Vincent Burunga
 Cate Blanchett as Elizabeth Ashton
 Justine Saunders as Millie Carmichael
 Bob Maza as Alf Dyer
 Steven Vidler as Phil McCarthy
 Shane Connor as Ben Lovell
 David Ngoombujarra as Mujadi Burunga
 Jeremy Sims as Garth Maddern
 Paul Caesar as Macka Hargraves
 Bradley Byguar as Ricky Dyer
 Wes Patten as Chris Dyer
 Rachael Maza as Leila Sutton
 David Kennedy as Robert Sutton
 Aaron Pedersen as Clarrie Carmichael

Accolades 
 1994 — Human Rights and Equal Opportunity Commission TV Drama Award presented to executive producers Penny Chapman and Bruce West

See also 
 List of Australian television series

References

External links 
 
 Australian Television Information Archive
 Heartland at the National Film and Sound Archive

Australian Broadcasting Corporation original programming
Australian drama television series
1994 Australian television series debuts
1994 Australian television series endings
Indigenous Australian television series